Zapala Airport  is an airport serving Zapala, a city in the Neuquén Province of Argentina.

See also

Transport in Argentina
List of airports in Argentina

References

External links

OpenStreetMap - Zapala Airport
OurAirports - Zapala Airport

Airports in Argentina